Vladimir Igorevich Pashkov (born 4 February 1961) was Deputy Prime Minister of the Government of the Donetsk People's Republic which is recognised only by Russia and two other partially-recognised states, having been in office since 19 April 2018  until 1 November 2021  
For a short time, (5 February 2020 –14 February 2020 ) Vladimir Pashkov was also Acting Prime Minister of the Government of the Donetsk People's Republic.
 
He had previously served as Deputy Governor of the Irkutsk Oblast, (2008, 2012–2015), but left the post in 2015, First Deputy Chairman of the Government of the Irkutsk Oblast (2010–2012), Minister of Economic Development, Labor, Science and Higher Education of the Irkutsk Oblast (2008), Vice Mayor of the city of Bratsk (2005).

He is also the general director of ZAO Vneshtorgservis, a company used to manage confiscated industries in the DPR and LPR. Pashkov was sanctioned by the US Treasury Department in 2018. In February 2020, a spokesman for Russian president Putin denied that Pashkov represented the Russian government.

References 

1961 births
Living people
People of the Donetsk People's Republic
People from Bratsk
Russian individuals subject to the U.S. Department of the Treasury sanctions